Kongres Buruh Seluruh Indonesia ('All Indonesia Labour Congress') was a trade union centre in Indonesia. It was politically linked to the Socialist Party of Indonesia (PSI). KBSI was founded in 1952, in an attempt from the socialists to counter the influence of the PKI-led SOBSI trade union centre.

KBSI was banned in 1960.

References

Trade unions in Indonesia
1960 disestablishments in Indonesia